Roberto Monzón González (born 30 March 1978) is a Cuban wrestler who competed in the 2004 Summer Olympics and in the 2008 Summer Olympics. He was born in Havana.

References

External links
 

1978 births
Living people
Olympic wrestlers of Cuba
Wrestlers at the 2004 Summer Olympics
Wrestlers at the 2008 Summer Olympics
Olympic silver medalists for Cuba
Olympic medalists in wrestling
Medalists at the 2004 Summer Olympics
Cuban male sport wrestlers
Pan American Games gold medalists for Cuba
Pan American Games medalists in wrestling
Wrestlers at the 2003 Pan American Games
Medalists at the 2003 Pan American Games
21st-century Cuban people